Lara Pulver (born 1 September 1980) is an English actress. She has played Erin Watts in the BBC spy drama Spooks and Irene Adler on BBC's TV adaptation Sherlock. She won the 2016 Olivier Award for Best Supporting Actress in a Musical in the West End's revival of the Broadway musical Gypsy.

Early life
Pulver was born in Southend-on-Sea, Essex, England. Her father is from a Jewish family; her mother converted to Judaism when they married. She has a sister, Erika who is four years older and works as a teacher. Pulver attended the National Youth Music Theatre between 1994 and 1998, as well as The Liz Burville Dance Centre, Bexley. In 1997, she began studying at the Doreen Bird College of Performing Arts, and graduated in 2000. She has since worked as an actress, singer and dancer in West End musicals.

Career
Pulver was nominated for the 2008 Olivier Award for Best Actress in a Musical for the role of Lucille Frank in the first West End production of the musical Parade at the Donmar Warehouse. She reprised the role in the Los Angeles production at the Mark Taper Forum opposite T.R. Knight.

In 2008, Pulver recorded a song for the CD Act One – Songs from the Musicals of Alexander S. Bermange. Pulver joined the cast of the BBC's Robin Hood in 2009 as Isabella, the sister of Guy of Gisbourne.

In 2010, Pulver joined the cast of the third series of HBO's True Blood as Sookie Stackhouse's fairy godmother, Claudine Crane.

Pulver played Erin Watts, the new chief of Section D, in the tenth and final series of BBC spy drama Spooks, a role she reprised in the 2015 feature film Spooks: The Greater Good

Pulver played Irene Adler in "A Scandal in Belgravia", the first episode of the second series of Sherlock. Her appearance caused an "enormous" response, with the Evening Standard calling the scene where she greets Sherlock Holmes nude "infamous". To The Telegraph, Pulver called the scene "empowering". The BBC received over 100 complaints about the footage.

In 2012 she joined the cast of Da Vinci's Demons as the "seductive and minded" Clarice Orsini, a series regular and wife of Lorenzo Medici.

In 2014, she played Louise in a revival of Gypsy at the Chichester Festival Theatre. The production transferred to the West End in April 2015. Miss Pulver won the 2016 Olivier Award for Best Supporting Actress in a Musical for the same role in the Savoy Theatre production of Gypsy. Louise is actually the title role, as "Louise" becomes the real-life early-20th-century American strip-tease sensation Gypsy Rose Lee, on whose memoirs the musical is based. Pulver's co-star in the Savoy production, Imelda Staunton, won the 2016 Olivier Award for Best Actress in a Musical for her role as the larger-than-life Mama Rose.

Personal life
In 2003, Pulver met American actor Josh Dallas while he was in the UK studying at the Mountview Academy of Theatre Arts. They married over Christmas 2007 in a 16th-century barn in Devon. The couple honeymooned in the Maldives. Dallas confirmed their divorce in an interview on Bob Rivers's radio show on 2 December 2011.

Pulver began dating fellow Spooks actor Raza Jaffrey in 2012 and the two married on 27 December 2014. They reside in Los Angeles. The couple have a son and daughter.

Filmography

Film

Television

Other
 Game of Thrones (2014; Video Game), as Lady Elissa Forrester

Stage credits
 Parade (Lucille Frank), Donmar Warehouse, nominated for Laurence Olivier Award for Best Actress in a Musical and Whatsonstage.com Awards
 Into the Woods (Lucinda), Royal Opera House
 The Last Five Years (Cathy), Menier Chocolate Factory
 Honk! (Henrietta), Royal National Theatre (Best New Musical, Laurence Olivier Awards 2000) and national tour
 Miss Saigon (Ellen)
 High Society
 A Chorus Line (Bebe)
 The Darling Buds of May
 The Boy Friend
 Gypsy (Louise)
 Chicago
 Grease
 42nd Street
 The Wizard of Oz
 (Adverts) Smirnoff Vodka Range – Hatter's Summer Night Dream with Smirnoff
 Uncle Vanya

Awards and nominations

Television

Theatre

References

External links
 

1980 births
Living people
21st-century English actresses
Actresses from Essex
Alumni of Bird College
English Jews
English people of Jewish descent
English stage actresses
English television actresses
Jewish English actresses
People from Southend-on-Sea